Bergvik is a locality situated in Söderhamn Municipality, Gävleborg County, Sweden with 834 inhabitants in 2010.

Sports
The following sports clubs are located in Bergvik:

 IFK Bergvik

References 

Populated places in Söderhamn Municipality
Hälsingland